Cochylimorpha mongolicana is a species of moth of the family Tortricidae. It is found in Central Asia (Transcaspia: Tura, Saisan, Kuldja, Turkestan).

References

M
Moths of Asia
Moths described in 1894